The 36th Annual Annie Awards, honoring the best in animation for 2008, were held on January 30, 2009, at Royce Hall in Los Angeles, California. Below is a list of announced nominees. Kung Fu Panda received the most awards with 10, winning nearly all of its nominations, albeit amid controversy.

Production nominees
Nominations announced on December 1, 2008.

Best Animated Feature
  Kung Fu Panda
 Bolt
 $9.99
 WALL-E
 Waltz with Bashir

Annie Award for Best Home Entertainment Production
 Futurama: The Beast with a Billion Backs
 Batman: Gotham Knight
 Christmas Is Here Again
 Justice League: The New Frontier
 The Little Mermaid: Ariel's Beginning

Annie Award for Best Animated Short Subject
 Wallace & Gromit: A Matter of Loaf and Death
 Glago's Guest
 Hot Dog
 Presto
 Sebastian's Voodoo

Annie Award for Best Animated Television Commercial
 United Airlines "Heart"
 Giant Monster
 Long Legs Mr. Hyde
 Rotofugi: The Collectors
 Sarah

Annie Award for Best Animated Television Production
 Robot Chicken: Star Wars Episode II
 King of the Hill
 Moral Orel
 Phineas and Ferb
 The Simpsons

Best Animated Television Production for Children
 Avatar: The Last Airbender – Nickelodeon A Miser Brothers' Christmas – Warner Bros.
 Foster's Home for Imaginary Friends – Cartoon Network
 Underfist: Halloween Bash – Cartoon Network
 The Mighty B! – Nickelodeon

Annie Award for Best Animated Video Game
 Kung Fu Panda
 Dead Space
 WALL-E

Individual Achievement

Animated Effects
 Li-Ming Lawrence Lee -  Kung Fu Panda
 Alen Lai - Dr. Seuss’ Horton Hears A Who
 Fangwei Lee - Madagascar: Escape 2 Africa
 Kevin Lee - Bolt
 Enrique Vila - Wall-E

Character Animation in a Feature Production
 James Baxter – Kung Fu Panda
 Jeff Gabor – Dr. Seuss’ Horton Hears A Who
 Philippe Le Brun – Kung Fu Panda
 Victor Navone – Wall-E
 Dan Wagner – Kung Fu Panda

Character Animation in a Television Production
 Pierre Perifel - Secrets of the Furious Five
 Sandro Cleuzo - Secrets of the Furious Five
 Joshua A. Jennings - Robot Chicken: Star Wars Episode II

Character Design in an Animated Feature Production
 Nico Marlet - Kung Fu Panda
 Valerie Hadida - Igor
 Sang Jun Lee - Dr. Seuss’ Horton Hears A Who

Character Design in an Animated Television Production
 Nico Marlet - Secrets of the Furious Five
 Bryan Arnett – Mighty B! - "Bat Mitzah Crashers"
 Ben Balistreri - Foster's Home for Imaginary Friends - "Mondo Coco"
 Sean Galloway - The Spectacular Spider-Man
 Jorge Gutierrez – El Tigre: The Adventures of Manny Rivera - "The Good, The Bad, The Tigre"

Directing in an Animated Feature Production
 John Stevenson and Mark Osborne - Kung Fu Panda
 Sam Fell and Rob Stevenhagen The Tale Of Despereaux
 Ari Folman - Waltz with Bashir
 Tatia Rosenthal - $9.99
 Andrew Stanton - WALL-E

Directing in an Animated Television Production
 Joaquim Dos Santos – Avatar: The Last Airbender - "Sozin’s Comet: Into the Inferno"
 Bob Anderson - The Simpsons - "Treehouse of Horror XIX"
 Craig McCracken and Rob Renzetti - Foster's Home for Imaginary Friends - "Destination Imagination"
 Chris McKay – Moral Orel - "Passing"
 Alan Smart - SpongeBob SquarePants - "Penny Foolish"

Music in an Animated Feature Production
 Hans Zimmer & John Powell –  Kung Fu Panda – DreamWorks Animation
 Kevin Manthei - Batman: Gotham Knight - Warner Bros. Animation
 John Powell - Dr. Seuss’ Horton Hears A Who - Blue Sky Studios
 Max Richter – Waltz With Bashir – Sony Pictures Classics, Bridgit Folman, Les Films D'ici, Razor Films
 William Ross – The Tale of Despereaux (film) – Universal Pictures

Music in an Animated Television Production or Short Form
 Henry Jackman, Hans Zimmer & John Powell – Secrets of the Furious Five – DreamWorks Animation
 Carl Finch & Brave Combo - Click and Clack's As the Wrench Turns – CTTV Productions
 Kevin Kiner – Star Wars The Clone Wars: Rising Malevolence – Lucasfilm Animation Ltd.
 Guy Moon – Back at the Barnyard Cowman: The Uddered Avenger – Nickelodeon/Omation
 Guy Michelmore – Growing Up Creepie: Rockabye Freakie – Taffy Entertainment LLC

Production Design in an Animated Feature Production
 Tang Heng Kung Fu Panda – DreamWorks Animation
 Ralph Eggleston Wall·E – Pixar Animation Studios
 Paul Felix Bolt – Walt Disney Animation Studios
 Evgeni Tomov The Tale Of Despereaux – Universal Pictures
 Raymond Zibach Kung Fu Panda – DreamWorks Animation

Production Design in an Animated Television Production or Short Form
 Tang Heng Secrets of the Furious Five – DreamWorks Animation
 Andy Harkness Glago's Guest – Walt Disney Animation Studios
 Seonna Hong – The Mighty B! "Bee Patients" – Nickelodeon
 Dan Krall – Chowder "The Heavy Sleeper" – Cartoon Network Studios
 Raymond Zibach Secrets of the Furious Five – DreamWorks Animation

Storyboarding in an Animated Feature Production
 Jennifer Yuh Nelson – Kung Fu Panda – DreamWorks Animation
 Alessandro Carloni – Kung Fu Panda – DreamWorks Animation
 Ronnie Del Carmen – Wall·E – Pixar Animation Studios
 Joe Mateo Bolt – Walt Disney Animation Studios
 Rob Stevenhagen – The Tale Of Despereaux – Universal Pictures

Storyboarding in an Animated Television Production or Short Form
 Chris Williams Glago's Guest – Walt Disney Animation Studios
 Butch Hartman – Fairly OddParents "Mission: Responsible" – Nickelodeon
 Andy Kelly – Ni Hao, Kai-Lan "Twirly Whirly Flyers" – Nickelodeon Productions/Nelvana
 Andy Schuhler – Secret of the Furious Five – DreamWorks Animation
 Eddie Trigueros The Mighty B! "Name Shame"– Nickelodeon

Voice Acting in an Animated Feature Production
 Dustin Hoffman – Voice of Shifu – Kung Fu Panda – DreamWorks Animation
 Ben Burtt – Voice of Wall·E – Wall·E – Pixar Animation Studios
 James Hong – Voice of Mr. Ping – Kung Fu Panda – DreamWorks Animation
 Ian McShane – Voice of Tai Lung – Kung Fu Panda – DreamWorks Animation
 Mark Walton – Voice of Rhino – Bolt – Walt Disney Animation Studios

Voice Acting in an Animated Television Production or Short Form
 Ahmed Best – Voice of Jar Jar Binks – Robot Chicken: Star Wars Episode II - ShadowMachine
 Seth MacFarlane – Voice of Peter Griffin – Family Guy "I Dream of Jesus" – Fox TV Animation/Fuzzy Door Productions
 Dwight Schultz – Voice of Mung Daal – Chowder "Apprentice Games" – Cartoon Network Studios

Writing in an Animated Feature Production
 Jonathan Aibel & Glenn Berger – Kung Fu Panda – DreamWorks Animation
 Etan Cohen and Eric Darnell & Tom McGrath – Madagascar: Escape 2 Africa – DreamWorks Animation
 Ari Folman – Waltz With Bashir – Sony Pictures Classics, Bridgit Folman, Les Films D'ici, Razor Films
 Cinco Paul and Ken Daurio – Dr. Seuss’ Horton Hears A Who – Blue Sky Studios

Writing in an Animated Television Production or Short Form
  Tom Root, Douglas Goldstein, Hugh Davidson, Mike Fasolo, Seth Green, Dan Milano, Matthew Senreich, Kevin Shinick, Zeb Wells, Breckin Meyer – Robot Chicken: Star Wars Episode II – ShadowMachine
 Joel H. Cohen – The Simpsons "The Debarted" – Gracie Films/Fox TV
 Scott Kreamer – El Tigre: The Adventures of Manny Rivera "Mustache Love" – Nickelodeon
 Paul McEvoy and Todd Berger – Secrets of the Furious Five – DreamWorks Animation
 Chris Williams – Glago's Guest – Walt Disney Animation Studios

Juried award winners
 Winsor McCay Award — Mike Judge, John Lasseter and Nick Park
 June Foray Award — Bill Turner
 Certificate of Merit — Amir Avni, Mike Fontanelli, Kathy Turner and Alex Vassilev

References

External links
 36th Annual Annie Nominations and Awards Recipients

2008
2008 film awards
Annie
Annie